Alexandra High School also known as AHS is a semi-private public high school in Pietermaritzburg, KwaZulu-Natal, South Africa. It offers a co-educational environment.

History
Alexandra High School is named after Queen Alexandra Caroline, Queen Consort of the United Kingdom. It opened on 23 February 1960. Though it was initially a whites-only, all-boys school, the first non-white pupil was admitted in June 1991. Alexandra High School became co-educational at the beginning of 1992. The school colours are maroon and blue.

The Badge, Houses and Motto
Mr Udal, the first headmaster, designed the school emblem, from the royal coat of arms of Queen Alexandra. Mr Udal took the Maltese Cross to incorporate in the badge. Mr Lee Boyd, M.E.C. for Education in the N.P.A. at the time of the school's inception and ex-mayor of Durban was a Knight of da Game in the Roman Catholic Church. The cross was given to Boyd's House as their symbol.

Then Mr Downs, Mayor of Pietermaritzburg, was approached for permission to use part of the city's coat of arms – hence the Elephant – emblem of Downs House.

Mr Allison, three times mayor, M.P.C. and freeman of the city, a neighbour of the school who took a great interest in Alex, had Allison's House named after him, and the Stars from the city's coat of arms formed the symbol of the house.

Shepstone House was named after the Administrator of Natal at the time of the purchase of land for the school, and as he had attended Queen Elizabeth's coronation, the crown was to be Shepstone's symbol.

Succeeding Mr Shepstone as Administrator was Mr Trollip. He was approached for permission to use part of the Natal badge – hence the Wildebeest (provided they faced the correct way and had white manes and tails). The wildebeest are the symbol of Trollip's House.

For the motto, Mr Udal's signet ring bore the words, Tant Que je Puis – archaic French, meaning "I do my best". Mr Lamond of Maritzburg College translated this into the Latin, Summa diligentia laboro. Then Mr Udal and his wife chose the colours of sky blue and maroon, and with the help of a local outfitter, devised blazers, badges, colours, rugby jerseys and all the other needs of a school.

The mural on the hall
The plaque was designed and built by the late Miss Syliva Baxter. It took months of work to mould, colour and bake the clay. It was fired in forty six pieces of ceramic clay, measuring 4 metres by 2 metres and its mass is over a ton. Metallic oxides were used to give it colour.

The plaque was unveiled by the late Senator A E Trollip, then Administrator of Natal, when the school was officially opened on 25 September 1964.

Uniform

 It is compulsory to wear a blazer with the Number 1 Uniform

Matric uniform differs slightly from that of other grades. Matrics are allowed to wear white jerseys, different ties and 'matric scarves'.
The boys are allowed to wear a different cut khaki uniform.

Awards
Awards are given for activities, with the level of award being determined by grade, years of service and level of achievement.

By receiving an award, students automatically receive all lower awards.

Sports

Basketball
Since the early 1980s.

Cross Country
Cross country is a sport the school does.

Soccer
Soccer is a sport in the school.

Rugby
Rugby is a major sport in the school. 

There are many other sports provided at the school including cricket, hockey, netball and many more.

Cultural Affairs

Debating

Music
The school offers students many activities who are interested in doing music. Students are offered things such as joining the Marimba Band, joining the Choir or joining the backstage crew.

Notable Old Alexandrians (by year of matriculation)

 
 
 
 
 

Buildings and structures in Pietermaritzburg
Schools in KwaZulu-Natal
Educational institutions established in 1960
1960 establishments in South Africa
High schools in South Africa